Tiu Shau Ngam (literally: "Hanging Hand Crag"), is a mountain in Hong Kong with a height of . It is located north of Ma On Shan, the tallest mountain in the region. 

It is part of the west ridge of The Hunch Backs and is a well-known precipitous peak. It is also one of 16 "high-risk locations" for hikers in Hong Kong.

See also 
 List of mountains, peaks and hills in Hong Kong
 Ma On Shan (peak)
 Ma On Shan Country Park

References